Wathumulla Grama Niladhari Division is a  Grama Niladhari Division of the  Ratmalana Divisional Secretariat  of Colombo District  of Western Province, Sri Lanka .  It has Grama Niladhari Division Code 544A.

Samudrasanna Vihara  are located within, nearby or associated with Wathumulla.

Wathumulla is a surrounded by the  Watarappala, Katukurunduwatta, Piriwena, Wedikanda and Mount Lavinia  Grama Niladhari Divisions.

Demographics

Ethnicity 

The Wathumulla Grama Niladhari Division has  a Sinhalese majority (70.6%), a significant Moor population (12.8%) and a significant Sri Lankan Tamil population (12.1%) . In comparison, the Ratmalana Divisional Secretariat (which contains the Wathumulla Grama Niladhari Division) has  a Sinhalese majority (78.9%)

Religion 

The Wathumulla Grama Niladhari Division has  a Buddhist majority (61.2%) and a significant Muslim population (15.2%) . In comparison, the Ratmalana Divisional Secretariat (which contains the Wathumulla Grama Niladhari Division) has  a Buddhist majority (70.0%) and a significant Muslim population (11.3%)

References 

Colombo District
Grama Niladhari divisions of Sri Lanka